Alberto Cerreti (7 February 1939 – 7 September 2019) was an Italian politician.

He served as Mayor of Sorano, Tuscany from 1972 to 1980. He was elected President of the Province of Grosseto on 7 September 1985.

Cerreti died in Montevarchi hospital on 7 September 2019.

References

External links
 

1939 births
2019 deaths
Mayors of places in Tuscany
Presidents of the Province of Grosseto
People from Sorano